Tim Norris (born November 20, 1957) is a current college head golf coach and a former professional golfer who played on the PGA Tour in the 1980s.

Early life
Norris was born and raised in Fresno, California. He started his collegiate career at Fresno City College before transferring to Fresno State University. In 1979, he was a second-team All-American, helped lead Fresno State to the Big West Championship, and was the winner of the Sun Bowl Golf Classic. In 1980, he was a first-team All-American, shared Big West Athlete-of-the-Year honors with Jay Don Blake, helped lead Fresno State to its second Big West Championship in as many years, and was Fresno State's Athlete-of-the-Year.

Professional career
Norris had 11 top-10 finishes in PGA Tour events including a win at the 1982 Sammy Davis Jr.-Greater Hartford Open. Norris established the tournament record at 259 (25-under), which stood until it was eclipsed in 2009 by Kenny Perry. He was only one of two players to go wire-to-wire without sharing the lead. He defeated Raymond Floyd and Hubert Green by six strokes. His best finish in a major was T-40 at the 1985 PGA Championship.

In the 1990s, Norris switch careers from touring professional to college coach. He was men's head golf coach at University of Texas-El Paso from 1990–1997. Since August 1, 1997, he has been the men's head golf coach at Kansas State University in Manhattan, Kansas. When he arrived at K-State, he inherited a program that had finished dead last in the Big Eight Conference for 14 straight years from 1978–1991. Norris has made steady progress transforming the Wildcat's into winners; they appeared in the NCAA Regionals in 2003, 2004 and 2005. During the 2003-2004 season, the Wildcats won the Purina Classic in St. Charles, Missouri, and finished T-4 in the final Big 12 Conference standings.  

Norris is married to the former Shelley Kerr. They have two children, Ashley and Tyler, and live in Manhattan, Kansas.

Professional wins (4)

PGA Tour wins (1)

Other wins (3)
1980 California State Open
1986 Spalding Invitational
1992 Sun Country PGA Championship

Results in major championships

Note: Norris never played in The Open Championship.

CUT = missed the half-way cut
"T" = tied

See also
Fall 1980 PGA Tour Qualifying School graduates
1986 PGA Tour Qualifying School graduates
1987 PGA Tour Qualifying School graduates

References

External links

American male golfers
Fresno State Bulldogs men's golfers
PGA Tour golfers
College golf coaches in the United States
Golfers from California
Golfers from Kansas
Fresno City College alumni
University of Texas at El Paso people
Kansas State University people
Sportspeople from Fresno, California
Sportspeople from Manhattan, Kansas
1957 births
Living people